Lobesia neptunia is a moth of the family Tortricidae. It is found on the Canary Islands and Madeira.

The wingspan is 9–12 mm. The forewings vary from ochreous to brownish ochreous or reddish fuscous. The hindwings are pale brownish grey.

The larvae feed on Frankenia ericifolia and Limonium pectinatum. They mine the leaves of their host plant. Young larvae make short full-depth corridor-like mines. Older larvae live among spun leaves.

References

Moths described in 1907
Olethreutini